Peace Trail is the 36th studio album by Canadian / American singer-songwriter Neil Young, released on December 9, 2016, on Reprise Records. Co-produced by Young and John Hanlon, the album was recorded at record producer Rick Rubin's Shangri-La Studios.

Described as a "primarily acoustic" album, Young recorded Peace Trail with drummer Jim Keltner and bass guitarist Paul Bushnell.

Background and recording
Peace Trail was written and recorded following the release of Young's live album, Earth, in 2016. Despite working extensively with Promise of the Real throughout 2015 and 2016, Young opted to record a solo album with session musicians Jim Keltner (drums) and Paul Bushnell (bass). The album was recorded in four days.

Critical reception

Peace Trail received mixed reviews upon its release. At Metacritic, which assigns a normalized rating out of 100 to reviews from mainstream critics, the album has received an average score of 57, based on 18 reviews, indicating "mixed or average reviews".

In a positive review for Uncut, Damien Love expressed surprise that Young opted not to record with his current backing band Promise of the Real, but praised the album's collaborators, Paul Bushnell and Jim Keltner: "Bushnell provides that perfect kind of bass you barely notice. Keltner’s percussion is a different story. Captured mostly in first or second takes, he doesn’t so much keep the beat as respond to what Young is doing, an improvised interplay of odd, shaggy patterns. The record often becomes a duet between Young and Keltner." In another positive review for Classic Rock Magazine, Rob Hughes wrote: "While it may not be the most musically involved album of his 50-year career, it’s persuasive evidence that Young still has a lot to offer."

In a mostly positive review for Pitchfork, Sam Sodomsky praised Young's dedication to releasing politically charged albums and his prolific output: "While Young’s voice has certainly never sounded older than it does here, there’s something youthful about his energy. Besides the fact that his two-album-a-year-clip keeps him in pace with your Ty Segalls or John Dwyers, his music is guided by a restless determination to cover new ground and speak his mind."

In a negative review for Allmusic, Stephen Thomas Erlewine suggests that the album's recording process was rushed: "It's interesting aesthetically, but the problem with Peace Trail isn't the concept, it's the execution. Intended as a musical bulletin à la "Ohio" or Living with War, Peace Trail is filled with songs about its precise moment in time, but the execution is so artless it veers toward indifference."

Track listing

Charts

References

2016 albums
Neil Young albums
Albums produced by Neil Young
Reprise Records albums
Albums produced by John Hanlon
Albums recorded at Shangri-La (recording studio)